Crostwitz (German) or Chrósćicy (Upper Sorbian) is a village and municipality in the center of the German district of Bautzen in Saxony. It is located in Upper Lusatia and is one of the centres of the Sorbian settlement area in Saxony.

Geography 
The village of Crostwitz is situated at between 160 up to 180 metres above sea level on both sides of Satkula brook, which flows into the Klosterwasser not far from the place. The eastern part of the settlement is dominated by the Church's hill, which is bordered by the brook in the south and the west. The larger part of Crostwitz stretches at the west side of Satkula, direction Panschwitz-Kuckau.

History 
Crostwitz was first mentioned in 1225 as seat of Henricus de Crostiz. In 1945, the Sorbian Domowina was refounded here only 2 days after the war in this part of Germany ended.

Population 
Crostwitz is situated in the south-west of the Sorbian heartland and is one of its centres. The major part of the population speaks Sorbian as their first language and is of Catholic denomination.

References 

Municipalities in Saxony
Populated places in Bautzen (district)